John Peter La Frenz (born February 1, 1876) was an American politician from New York.

Life
He was born on February 1, 1876, in Wilmington, New Hanover County, North Carolina. After the death of his father, his mother went with him to live in Brooklyn, Kings County, New York. There he attended the public schools. Afterwards he became a cooper.

LaFrenz entered politics as a Democrat. In November 1913, he was elected on the Progressive, Republican and Independence League tickets to the New York State Assembly (Kings Co., 14th D.), defeating the incumbent Democrat James J. Garvey. LaFrenz was re-elected three times as a Democrat, and was a member of the State Assembly in 1914, 1915, 1916 and 1917.

References

1876 births
Year of death missing
Politicians from Brooklyn
Democratic Party members of the New York State Assembly
New York (state) Progressives (1912)
20th-century American politicians
Politicians from Wilmington, North Carolina